Kelli-Leigh Henry-Davila (born 1984/1985), known simply as Kelli-Leigh, is a British singer and songwriter.

She is best known for being the uncredited vocalist in the UK number one singles "I Got U" by Duke Dumont featuring Jax Jones ("My Love Is Your Love"'s Whitney Houston's cover) and "I Wanna Feel" by Second City, as well as the credited vocalist in the UK top 10 single "More Than Friends" by James Hype. She has also performed backing vocals for Adele and Leona Lewis among others.

On 23 February 2018, she released her debut solo single "Do You Wanna Be Loved Like This?", through her own record label Music Core Limited.

In 2011, Kelli-Leigh joined Adele's touring band as a backup singer.

Discography

Extended plays

Singles

As a solo artist

As a featured artist

References

1980s births
Living people
Year of birth uncertain
21st-century English women singers
21st-century English singers